The Dominion of Kenya was a short-lived sovereign state between 12 December 1963 and 12 December 1964 whose head of state was Queen Elizabeth II. It was a predecessor to the Republic of Kenya.

When British Kenya became independent on 12 December 1963, Elizabeth II remained head of state as Queen of Kenya (and of the United Kingdom and many former colonies). The monarch's constitutional roles were mostly delegated to the Governor-General of Kenya, Malcolm John Macdonald.

Jomo Kenyatta held office as prime minister (and head of government). Elizabeth II had visited Kenya on 6 February 1952, before independence, and later visited the Republic of Kenya several times.

The Republic of Kenya came into existence on 12 December 1964, while remaining in the Commonwealth by common consent of other governments. Following the abolition of the monarchy, Jomo Kenyatta became the first President of the Republic of Kenya.

References

Further reading

1963 establishments in Kenya
1960s disestablishments in Kenya
Kenya
History of Kenya
Government of Kenya
Kenya and the Commonwealth of Nations
Monarchy
Politics of Kenya
States and territories established in 1963
States and territories disestablished in 1964